Corylus chinensis, common names Chinese filbert and Chinese hazel, is a deciduous tree native to western China. This tree is considered vulnerable due of its rarity.

Description

This species grows up to 40 metres tall. It has gray-brown, fissured bark, with mottled streaks. The branchlets are a purplish-brown colour, and are slender and sparsely villous.

The leaves range from ovate to obovate-elliptic and have a doubly serrated, irregular margin.

Distribution
Corylus chinensis is found on the moist slopes of forests at altitudes ranging from 1200 and 3500 metres.  It is reported from Tibet, Xinjiang, Gansu, Guizhou, Hubei, Shaanxi, Sichuan, and Yunnan.

Uses
Both the oil and seeds of Corylus chinensis are edible.

Distribution

This tree is native to Henan, Hubei, Hunan, Shaanxi, Sichuan, and Yunnan.

References

External links
Images showing nuts and leaves
Images of various parts

chinensis
Trees of China
Endemic flora of China
Plants described in 1899